Evolution: The Hits is a compilation album from the British dance/pop band Dead or Alive, in 2003.

Evolution: The Hits is the band's second "greatest hits" collection, after 1987's Rip It Up. This collection spans their musical history from their 1984 debut album, Sophisticated Boom Boom, to 2000's Fragile, and contains all their single releases and several remixes.

The album was released in two editions - a single disc containing 18 tracks, and a double disc 'Collector's Edition', containing 28 tracks. The group's biggest hit, "You Spin Me Round (Like a Record)", was re-released as a single to promote Evolution: The Hits. A video compilation was also released on DVD.

Track listing

Collector's Edition

CD 1
"You Spin Me Round (Like a Record)" (Performance Mix) - 7:27 ** from Youthquake
"My Heart Goes Bang (Get Me to the Doctor)" (12" US Wipe Out Mix) - 6:01 ***  from Youthquake
"Sex Drive" - 6:37  from Nukleopatra
"What I Want" - 5:49  from Sophisticated Boom Boom
"Brand New Lover" - 4:48  from Mad, Bad and Dangerous to Know
"Misty Circles" - 4:39  from Sophisticated Boom Boom
"Lover Come Back to Me" - 4:57  from Youthquake
"I'll Save All My Kisses" - 3:36  from Mad, Bad and Dangerous to Know
"I Don't Wanna Be Your Boyfriend" - 4:43  from Nude
"Hooked on Love" - 5:15  from Mad, Bad and Dangerous to Know
"I'm a Star" - 4:35  from Nukleopatra
"Something in My House" (2000 Remix) - 5:06  from Mad, Bad and Dangerous to Know
"Isn't It a Pity" - 4:44  from Fragile
"You Spin Me Round (Like a Record)" (Alternative Metro 7" Edit) - 4:25  Previously unreleased

CD 2
"I'd Do Anything" - 5:24  from Sophisticated Boom Boom
"Come Home (With Me Baby)" - 3:58  from Nude
"That's the Way (I Like It)" - 3:05  from Sophisticated Boom Boom
"International Thing" - 3:44  from Nukleopatra
"In Too Deep" - 3:48  from Youthquake
"Unhappy Birthday" - 7:32  from Fan the Flame (Part 1)
"I Paralyze" - 5:57  from Fragile
"Baby Don't Say Goodbye" - 6:15  from Nude
"Turn Around and Count 2 Ten" - 6:55  from Nude
"Your Sweetness Is Your Weakness" - 5:49  from Fan the Flame (Part 1)
"Nukleopatra" - 4:19  from Nukleopatra
"Rebel Rebel" - 4:04  from Nukleopatra
"Hit and Run Lover" - 4:40  from Fragile
"You Spin Me Round (Like a Record)" (Mark Moore & Mr. Motion Remix) - 6:20  Previously unreleased

Standard version
"You Spin Me Round (Like a Record)" - 3:16 from Youthquake
"That's the Way (I Like It)" - 3:05 from Sophisticated Boom Boom
"In Too Deep" - 3:48 from Youthquake
"What I Want" - 5:49 from Sophisticated Boom Boom
"Misty Circles" - 4:39 from Sophisticated Boom Boom
"I'd Do Anything" - 4:00 from Sophisticated Boom Boom
"Lover Come Back to Me" (2003 Remix) - 5:37 * from Youthquake
"I'll Save You All My Kisses" - 3:36 from Mad, Bad and Dangerous to Know
"Hooked on Love" - 5:15 from Mad, Bad and Dangerous to Know
"Come Home with Me Baby" - 3:58 from Nude
"My Heart Goes Bang (Get Me to the Doctor)" (7" US Wipe Out Mix) - 3:56 from Youthquake
"Sex Drive" - 5:42 from Nukleopatra
"Turn Around and Count 2 Ten" (2003 Remix) - 5:16 * from Nude
"Hit and Run Lover" - 4:40 from Fragile
"Isn't It a Pity" - 4:44 from Fragile
"Brand New Lover" - 4:07 from Mad, Bad and Dangerous to Know
"Something in My House" - 3:49 from Mad, Bad and Dangerous to Know
"You Spin Me Round (Like a Record)" (Metro 7" Edit) - 3:47 Previously unreleased

 (*) These versions are incorrectly titled. They are actually the 2000 remixes from the Fragile album.

 (**) Incorrectly listed as the Murder Mix.

 (***) Slightly edited from the original 6:19 12" version.

Personnel
Dead or Alive, Zeus B. Held, Stock, Aitken & Waterman, Phil Harding (The Mixmaster), Mark McGuire, Jay Burnett, Tim Weidner, Barry Stone, Les Sharma, Simon Barnecott, Graham Stack, Princess Julia, John Taylor, Punx Soundcheck, Mark Moore & David Motion: production
Tim Pope, Vaughan Arnell, Anthea Benton, Tony Vanden Ende, Zanna: video editors
Linda Fletcher: management
James & James: photography
Julian Gozra Lozano: art direction, digital manipulation, artwork
Simon Catwell: design
Andie Airfix & Satori, Lynn Burns: artwork

Chart positions

Album

Singles

See also
Mad, Bad, and Dangerous to Know (Dead or Alive album)

References

External links
Amazon.com: customer reviews and audio samples of all 18 tracks on single disc version.

2003 greatest hits albums
Dead or Alive (band) compilation albums
Albums produced by Stock Aitken Waterman
Epic Records compilation albums
Sony Music compilation albums